Oligopithecidae is an extinct basal Catarrhine family from the late Eocene of Egypt (about 37 million years ago) as sister of the rest of the Catarrhines. Its members were probably insectivorous due to their simple molars and cusp arrangement.

References

External links
Mikko's Phylogeny Archive - †Oligopithecidae

Eocene primates
Eocene first appearances
Rupelian extinctions
Prehistoric mammal families
Primate families